Piyavi Wijewardene (Upul Piyavi Wijewardene) (born 7 November 1982) is a Sri Lankan researcher, lecturer, author and the chief executive officer of the Odiliya Group. He is the former Director of Institute of Human Capital Development and one of the Examiners at Sri Lanka Institute of Development Administration. He is a member of the Academy for Global Business Advancement and the Chapter President, Sri Lanka at the International Management Research and Technology Consortium. He served as the Head of Academics at the Management and Science University. He was instead worked as an executive officer at the Capital Maharaja Organization.

Piyavi attended the 13th World Congress 2016 as his doctoral research was selected by the AGBA, United States under the category of higher education. Piyavi Wijewardene delivered a special speech on the enhancement of environmental awareness at the International Forestry and Environment Symposium 2015. His joint research with co-author Dinesh Abeywickrama on Green Banking was awarded at the International Multidisciplinary Research Conference 2016.

Early life and education 
Born to a middle-class family in Colombo he received his initial school education at D. B Jayathilaka Vidyalaya, Colombo 10, before being admitted to Ananda College, Colombo. His father, Piyadasa Wijewardene, was a senior assessor, while his mother Vinitha Wijewardene was a government clerk. He is a degree holder from the University of Peradeniya, holds a Master's in Business Management from the University of Colombo. Then he received his Ph.D. in Business Management from Graduate School of Management, Management and Science University, Malaysia.

Honours and awards

“Distinguished Service Award” for his pioneering role in setting out a plan for a national media policy in Sri Lanka, By Centre of Executive Professional Development of London, 2020

Controversy

National media policy 

In March 2019, he co-founded a social movement with the help of several mainstream academics and professionals to urge Sri Lankan media channels to strengthen their development orientation in prime-time news bulletins. Soon after many in the sector criticized him stating that he is countering media channels due to personal grudges. Despite criticisms, he played a leading role in developing a national media policy for a draft act aimed at emphasizing that the broadcasters will be required to make informative components about the economy, technology, arts, and culture in prime time news bulletins. Further, his media policy has aimed towards, regulation of crime reports, training media on the scientific usage of airtime, tax concessions for media channels, insurance for reporting correspondents, minimum wage for workers, monitory board for survey reports and advertising regulatory indexes. In August 2020 he was awarded a “Distinguished Service Award” by Centre of Executive Professional Development of London, for his pioneering role in setting out the plan for the national media policy in Sri Lanka.

Protectionism 

A colleague and collaborator of H. D. Karunaratne, the pair researched jointly for several years as influential proponents of Sri Lankan Free Trade Agreements and Custom Unions. Piyavi has written several contentious articles on both Natural science and Social science related topics. His reveals on several government budgets been criticized by officials saying that he has created unnecessary fear on certain foreign trade agreements. His press reviews on Easter Sunday attacks in Sri Lanka was criticized stating that he was being pessimistic towards certain economic predictions. A BBC interview of him about the cancellation of cabinet meeting received many other disagreements pointing out that the relevance that he has made in between the relationship of cabinet meeting cancellation and country's economy is irrelevant. Several parties have claimed a strong national bias in his socio-economic opinions and stated that the materials released by many news reports  "never seems able to state anything damaging to the interests of the Protectionists". He stated press that he is neither rebellious nor acquiescent, but believe that consistent focus on priorities could lead to economical development of the nation.

References 

1982 births
Sinhalese academics
Living people